Roddy MacLeod, MBE (born 1962) is a Scottish bagpiper, director of the annual Piping Live! Festival and principal of the National Piping Centre.

He is known to be vocal against Scottish reforms in the realm of piping. In 2006, when the government ordered pipers to play quietly, and protect their ears whilst practising, he was quoted as saying; ""If you are practising to become a serious piper, you cannot do so within these kinds of limits." In the same year he campaigned to introduce means-testing to acquire a busker's licence in Edinburgh.

After speaking out against the lack of piping teachers in Scottish schools, he introduced Skype lessons in 2008 for would-be pipers as a potential solution to the problem. He also suggested that the chanter replace the recorder in primary schools.

He is a ten-time winner of the Piobaireachd at the Glenfiddich Solo Piping Championship; a record, and has won the overall title five times.

In 2012 he was inducted into the Scottish Traditional Hall of Fame.

References

Living people
Great Highland bagpipe players
Festival directors
Place of birth missing (living people)
1962 births
Gold Medal winners (bagpipes)
Members of the Order of the British Empire